John Falb (born December 13, 1971) is an American businessman and racing driver currently competing in the Asian Le Mans Series with Algarve Pro Racing.

He has been the president of the College Loan Corporation since 2002.

Racing record

Racing career summary 

† As Falb was a guest driver, he was ineligible to score points.

Complete European Le Mans Series results
(key) (Races in bold indicate pole position; results in italics indicate fastest lap)

References

External links 

 

1971 births
Living people
American racing drivers
European Le Mans Series drivers
Asian Le Mans Series drivers
FIA World Endurance Championship drivers
24 Hours of Le Mans drivers
G-Drive Racing drivers
United Autosports drivers
Sportspeople from Dallas
WeatherTech SportsCar Championship drivers
Le Mans Cup drivers
Starworks Motorsport drivers
Graff Racing drivers
Racing drivers from Texas